Hypostomus annectens is a species of catfish in the family Loricariidae. It is native to South America, where it occurs in the Cayapas River basin in Ecuador and the Patía River basin in Colombia. The species reaches 28 cm (11 inches) in total length and is believed to be a facultative air-breather. It is listed by ITIS as a member of Hemiancistrus as opposed to Hypostomus, which it is classified under according to FishBase.

References 

annectens
Species described in 1904